Luciane Freire Escouto (born 21 June 1987 in São Leopoldo) is a Brazilian volleyball player and a model. She devoted herself defending the newly created team volleyball Fluminense, with which it signed a contract to play for the championship in Rio in 2012. Before, she defended the team Mackenzie Sports Club Minas Gerais, having also spent by the teams of Osasco, Pinheiros, Banespa, Macae and Brusque. In 2011, at the insistence of her mother, she participated in the contest The Most Beautiful Gaucha and, despite the insecurity confesses, won the five thousand competitors. With that, she represented Rio Grande do Sul in contest Miss World Brazil in April 2013. Luciane also dreamt of a place in Brazilian national women's volleyball.

Biography

In an interview with WCB News, Luciane said she had 178 cm height at 11 years of age and her physical education teacher appointed her to a team of volleyball São Leopoldo. Soon, she was already in the selection and gaucho, with only 14 years old, was playing in the team's base Osasco, in São Paulo. She began playing with the team for the Superliga Banespa until 2012 and remained on professional teams category.

At the insistence of her mother, Veronica, she took part in the competition The Most Beautiful Gaucha. Though she had early on will be model, she feared no chance because of the molded body for the sport. In her words: "I thought I had potential. Model has to be supermagra and I, with chattering and cushion, thought would have no chance. " But Luciane and defeated five thousand candidates have applied automatically to represent her home state in the competition Miss Brazil World.

Still in her words:

She had to slow the pace of training to lose muscle mass and also had to change their diet in order to stay with "body model". Always thinking about this new challenge, did not neglect creams and other gimmicks typical of fashion and beauty how to ace miss. Indeed, even in games of volleyball, she never renounces the use of lipstick and other vanities. The beauty of Luciane earned her praise from presenters Tiago Leifert and Jô Soares, who came to ask her to marry him during the interview that she gave him on his nightly program. Additionally, she auditioned for Ford Models and signed to TV Pampa.

In November 2012, Luciane announced it has been contracted by the team of Unilever, whose coach was Bernardinho, and that would dispute the Superliga. It reaffirmed its commitment to the Miss World Brazil and said that while it would be a pleasure to play in a top team with a great coach and players enshrined alongside, which could be your passport to selection.

The success off the court rendered Luciane many opportunities as a model and led to her being invited to participate in television programs such as Jô Soares and the Danilo Gentili. Luciane has 185 cm high, 100 cm hips, 68 cm waist, bust 92 cm and weighs 73 kg. Among the contracts that model obtained, there is the commercial for CR Diementz, which is a company specializing in selling eletromóveis, and the contract with the store Les Chemises. In addition, she participates in charitable events such as the 12th and Race Walk GRAACC (Support Group for Adolescents and Children with Cancer), on May 6, 2012.

Miss World Brazil

On April 1, Luciane began her participation in the contest Miss World Brazil held in Mangalore, in Rio de Janeiro. She strove to improve her measures to suit contest, but it meant to slow the pace of training and cost her her position in Unilever, and stay out of the Superliga final. The contest, in its preliminary stage, involving other evidence beyond the catwalk and the question. There was evidence of fashion, in which the candidate rode her own look, and sports, in which the candidates practiced a mode currently set. Before, each could submit a video with a sample of specific talent. All evidence points counted for the definition of the sixteen finalists among the 38 participants from all over Brazil.

References

(in Portuguese)

External links
 Facebook

1987 births
Living people
Brazilian women's volleyball players
Brazilian female models
People from São Leopoldo
Sportspeople from Rio Grande do Sul